Club Baloncesto Marín Peixegalego, also known as Marín Ence Peixegalego for sponsorship reasons, is a basketball team based in Marín, Galicia (Spain). The team currently plays in league LEB Oro.

History

The Peixe played in Liga EBA until 2013, when, after playing its second promotion playoffs, it achieved a vacant berth in LEB Plata, the third tier.

On 25 March 2016, Marín were promoted to the second tier, LEB Oro, after finishing the season as champion of the LEB Plata and the Copa LEB Plata.

The club ended its debut in LEB Oro in last place, and was consequently relegated to LEB Plata. However, on 18 July 2017, the club announced it could not fulfil the requirements in the league and it would appeal against the decision of FEB. However, the appeal was denied and the club finally registered in the fourth-division Liga EBA.

After their forced relegation, the club returned to LEB Plata after completing a perfect season with 34 wins in 34 matches. Peixe achieved a new promotion on 25 May 2019, coming back to the LEB Oro three years later after their debut season.

Season by season

Players

Current roster

Trophies and awards

Trophies
LEB Plata: (1)
2016
Copa LEB Plata: (1)
2016
Liga EBA: (1)
2018

Awards
LEB Plata MVP
Javonte Green – 2016

Notable players
To appear in this section a player must have either:
 Set a club record or won an individual award as a professional player.
 Played at least one official international match for his senior national team or one NBA game at any time.
 José Acosta 
 Garfield Blair
 Javonte Green

References

External links
Official website
Presentation at Eurobasket.com

Basketball teams in Galicia (Spain)
LEB Plata teams
Basketball teams established in 2003
Province of Pontevedra